Acrux is the brightest star in the southern constellation of Crux. It has the Bayer designation α Crucis, which is Latinised to Alpha Crucis and abbreviated Alpha Cru or α Cru. With a combined visual magnitude of +0.76, it is the 13th-brightest star in the night sky. It is the most southerly star of the asterism known as the Southern Cross and is the southernmost first-magnitude star, 2.3 degrees more southerly than Alpha Centauri. This system is located at a distance of 321 light-years from the Sun.

To the naked eye Acrux appears as a single star, but it is actually a multiple star system containing six components. Through optical telescopes, Acrux appears as a triple star, whose two brightest components are visually separated by about 4 arcseconds and are known as Acrux A and Acrux B, α1 Crucis and α2 Crucis, or α Crucis A and α Crucis B. Both components are B-type stars, and are many times more massive and luminous than the Sun. α1 Crucis is itself a spectroscopic binary with components designated α Crucis Aa (officially named Acrux, historically the name of the entire system) and α Crucis Ab. Its two component stars orbit every 76 days at a separation of about 1 astronomical unit (AU). HR 4729, also known as Acrux C, is a more distant companion, forming a triple star through small telescopes. C is also a spectroscopic binary, which brings the total number of stars in the system to at least five.

Nomenclature

α Crucis (Latinised to Alpha Crucis) is the system's Bayer designation; α1 and α2 Crucis, those of its two main components stars. The designations of these two constituents as Acrux A and Acrux B and those of A's components—Acrux Aa and Acrux Ab—derive from the convention used by the Washington Multiplicity Catalog (WMC) for multiple star systems, and adopted by the International Astronomical Union (IAU).

The historical name Acrux for α1 Crucis is an "Americanism" coined in the 19th century, but entering common use only by the mid 20th century. In 2016, the International Astronomical Union organized a Working Group on Star Names (WGSN) to catalog and standardize proper names for stars. The WGSN states that in the case of multiple stars the name should be understood to be attributed to the brightest component by visual brightness. The WGSN approved the name Acrux for the star Acrux Aa on 20 July 2016 and it is now so entered in the IAU Catalog of Star Names.

Since Acrux is at −63° declination, making it the southernmost first-magnitude star, it is only visible south of latitude 27° North. It barely rises from cities such as Miami, United States, or Karachi, Pakistan (both around 25°N) and not at all from New Orleans, United States, or Cairo, Egypt (both about 30°N). Because of Earth's axial precession, the star was visible to ancient Hindu astronomers in India who named it Tri-shanku. It was also visible to the ancient Romans and Greeks, who regarded it as part of the constellation of Centaurus.

In Chinese,  ("Cross"), refers to an asterism consisting of Acrux, Mimosa, Gamma Crucis and Delta Crucis.

This star is known as Estrela de Magalhães ("Star of Magellan") in Portuguese.

Stellar properties

Their luminosities are 25,000 and 16,000 times that of the Sun. α1 and α2 orbit over such a long period that motion is only barely seen. From their minimum separation of 430 astronomical units, the period is estimated to be around 1,500 years.

The masses of α2 and the brighter component α1 suggest that the stars will someday explode as supernovae. Component Ab may perform electron capture in the degenerate O+Ne+Mg core and trigger a supernova explosion, otherwise it will become a massive white dwarf.

Photometry with the TESS satellite has shown that one of the stars in the α Crucis system is a β Cephei variable, although α1 and α2 Crucis are too close for TESS to resolve and determine which one is the pulsator.

Rizzuto and colleagues determined in 2011 that the α Crucis system was 66% likely to be a member of the Lower Centaurus–Crux sub-group of the Scorpius–Centaurus association. It was not previously seen to be a member of the group.

The cooler, less-luminous B-class star HR 4729 (HD 108250) lies 90 arcseconds away from triple star system α Crucis and shares its motion through space, suggesting it may be gravitationally bound to it, and it is therefore generally assumed to be physically associated. It is itself a spectroscopic binary system, sometimes catalogued as component C (Acrux C) of the Acrux multiple system. Another fainter visual companion listed as component D or Acrux D. A further seven faint stars are also listed as companions out to a distance of about two arc-minutes.

On 2 October 2008, the Cassini–Huygens spacecraft resolved three of the components (A, B and C) of the multiple star system as Saturn's disk occulted it.

In culture 

Acrux is represented in the flags of Australia, New Zealand, Samoa and Papua New Guinea as one of five stars which comprise the Southern Cross. It is also featured in the flag of Brazil, along with 26 other stars, each of which represents a state; Acrux representing the state of São Paulo. It is also represented (as part of the Southern Cross) on the cover of the current (from 2015) Brazilian passport.

The Brazilian oceanographic research vessel Alpha Crucis is named after the star.

See also 
 Lists of stars

References

External links
 http://jumk.de/astronomie/big-stars/acrux.shtml
 http://www.daviddarling.info/encyclopedia/A/Acrux.html

Crucis, Alpha
Double stars
B-type main-sequence stars
B-type subgiants
Crux (constellation)
Lower Centaurus Crux
Acrux
Triple star systems
6
060718
108248 9
4730 1
Crucis, 26 7
Spectroscopic binaries
Durchmusterung objects